Seán Feargal Sharkey  (born 13 August 1958) is a singer from Northern Ireland most widely known as the lead vocalist of punk band The Undertones in the 1970s and 1980s, and for solo works in the 1980s and 1990s. His 1985 solo single "A Good Heart" was an international success. After becoming less musically active in the early 1990s, he has performed various roles supporting the UK's commercial music industry, winning several awards and honours for his work in that area. 

Sharkey is also a lifelong fly fisherman and has campaigned against the pollution of British rivers (particularly chalk streams), and is the Chairman of the Amwell Magna Fishery. He has become a figurehead for the campaign to prevent water companies dumping sewage into UK waterways and coasts.

Biography

The Undertones (1976–1983)
Sharkey, who was born in Derry, Northern Ireland, joined The Undertones shortly after their formation in 1975. They had several UK hits, with songs such as "Teenage Kicks", "Here Comes The Summer", "My Perfect Cousin", "Wednesday Week" and "It's Going to Happen!". The band split in 1983 citing musical differences, with Sharkey pursuing a solo career and other members of the band forming That Petrol Emotion the following year.

The Assembly (1983)
Before his solo career took off, Sharkey was also the singer of the one-shot group The Assembly with ex-Yazoo and Depeche Mode member Vince Clarke (pre-Erasure). In 1983 their single "Never Never" was a No. 4 hit in the UK Singles Chart.

Solo career (1984–1991)
Sharkey's debut single was a collaboration with Madness member Cathal Smyth titled "Listen to Your Father". The single was released on Madness's label Zarjazz Records in 1984, reaching No. 23 in the UK chart. The track was performed on Top of the Pops with members of Madness.

Sharkey's solo work was significantly different from the post-punk offerings of The Undertones. His best-known solo material is the 1985 UK chart-topping single penned by Lone Justice frontwoman Maria McKee, "A Good Heart", which went to No. 1 in several countries including the UK in late 1985. He also had a UK Top 5 hit in 1986 with "You Little Thief". His eponymous debut album reached No. 12 in the UK Albums Chart.

Following on from his second album Wish in 1988, he achieved further success in 1991 with his UK Top 30 album Songs From The Mardi Gras, which produced the No. 12 hit single "I've Got News for You".

Music industry (1992–present)
Starting in the early 1990s Sharkey moved into the business side of the music industry, initially as A&R for Polydor Records, and then as managing director of EXP Ltd. He was appointed a member of the Radio Authority for five years from December 1998 to December 2003.

When the Undertones reunited in 1999, Sharkey was offered the opportunity to rejoin the group but turned down the offer. His position as lead vocalist/frontman for the Undertones was taken by fellow Derry native Paul McLoone, who is also a radio presenter for the Irish national and independent radio station, Today FM.

Sharkey became chairman of the UK Government task force the 'Live Music Forum' in 2004, to evaluate the impact of the Licensing Act 2003 on the performance of live music, and gave public evidence before the Culture, Media and Sport Committee on 11 November 2008.

In 2008, Sharkey was appointed as the CEO of British Music Rights, replacing Emma Pike. In October 2008, he became head of UK Music, an umbrella organisation representing the collective interests of the UK's commercial music industry. He has become prominent in criticising the use of Form 696 by the Metropolitan Police' requiring event promoters to provide data on performers and audiences. Sharkey resigned from UK Music on 11 November 2011.

In 2011 Sharkey made a one-off appearance in a set named Erasure + Special Guests singing Never Never. He stated that he had not sung live for 20 years and that Vince Clarke was the only person he would have returned for.

Sharkey appeared on BBC Newcastle, interviewed by Simon Logan on the afternoon show on 7 August 2013. He spoke about his career and his decision to retire from the stage: "I've had an absolutely brilliant career... It's time to get off the stage and make room for [new artists]".

Awards and honours
In 2004, Sharkey was awarded the "Scott Piering Award", by the radio industry for "recognising achievement in the promotion of music and the understanding of the music industry to their colleagues in radio". He is the only member of the Radio Authority to have been honoured in this way by the radio industry.

In 2006 he received the "Bottle Award" at the International Live Music Conference for "outstanding contribution to the live music industry".

In 2008, Sharkey was awarded an Honorary Doctor of Arts, by the University of Hertfordshire in recognition of outstanding achievement in the field of music.

In 2009 he entered The Guardian'''s MediaGuardian 100, described as the "MediaGuardian's annual guide to the most powerful people in television, radio, newspapers, magazines, digital media, media business, advertising, marketing and PR", at number 56.

In 2010 he appeared in Wired's The Wired 100, "Who are the people who shape the Wired world," at number 45. The same year he received a Doctor of Letters honoris causa from the University of Ulster in recognition of his services to music.

Sharkey was appointed Officer of the Order of the British Empire (OBE) in the 2019 Birthday Honours for services to music.

Environmental campaigning
Sharkey is a lifelong fly fisherman and has campaigned against the pollution of British rivers (particularly chalk streams),  and the regulations of the water industry which impact British water resources. He gave the keynote address at The Rivers Trust Autumn Conference 2018.

On 30 August 2020, Sharkey appeared in episode 3 of the second series of Mortimer & Whitehouse: Gone Fishing'' to discuss the environmental pressures faced by Britain's chalk rivers, during a conversation by the River Lea. He reappeared on episode 6 of the fifth series of Mortimer & Whitehouse: Gone Fishing on 14 October 2022 and discussed pollution in English rivers including the Thames and Wye. He is Chairman of the Amwell Magna Fishery.

He has subsequently become a figurehead for the campaign to prevent water companies dumping untreated sewage into UK waterways and coasts, appearing on television news coverage and gathering a large following on twitter, as well as supporting The Times campaign to "clean it up".

Discography

Studio albums

Singles

Promotional singles
 "Cry Like a Rainy Day" (1991)

References

External links
Ukmusic.org

1958 births
British music industry executives
Male singers from Northern Ireland
Pop singers from Northern Ireland
Rock singers from Northern Ireland
Living people
Musicians from Derry (city)
New wave musicians from Northern Ireland
Punk rock musicians from Northern Ireland
The Undertones members
The Assembly members
Officers of the Order of the British Empire
Zarjazz